Franklin Township is a township in Monroe County, Iowa, USA. As of March 2021, it has a population of 125 (all rural).

References

Townships in Monroe County, Iowa
Townships in Iowa